Lethenia is an extinct genus of mackerel shark from the Rupelian age of the Oligocene epoch. It is a monotypic genus, containing only L. vandenbroeki. It is considered closely related to Isurolamna and sometimes included within it. It differs in the morphology of its teeth, which are much more gracile than Isurolamna and has larger spacing between its crown and lateral cusps. Lethenia is rare and only known from isolated teeth. It is best known from the Boom Clay Formation of Belgium and the Uzunbas Formation of Kazakhstan.

References

Prehistoric shark genera
Animals described in 1999
Lamnidae